Malri is a village in Nakodar. Nakodar is a tehsil in the city Jalandhar of Indian state of Punjab.

Transportation 
Malri lies on the Nakodar-Jalandhar road.  It is almost one km from Nakodar. Earlier it was a village, now as the city is expanding, It is part of Nakodar Town.  The nearest railway station to Malri is Nakodar railway station at a distance of one km.

Malri is famous for Baba Mal. This Village is  historic and is associated with Shri Guru Arjun Dev Ji(5th Guru under the lineage of Guru Nanak Dev Ji). 
Baba Mal was blessed by Guru Arjun Dev ji that whosoever comes here and uses its sand on the body parts suffering from arthritis gets benefited.Now, a very beautiful Gurudwara is constructed around the tree under which Baba Mal used to cure patients of arthritis.

Post code & STD code 
Malri's post code and STD code are 144040 and 01821 respectively.

References 

  Official website of Punjab Govt. with Malri's details

Villages in Jalandhar district
Villages in Nakodar tehsil